Mary L. Gray is an American anthropologist and author. She is a Fellow at Harvard University's Berkman Klein Center for Internet and Society, as well as a Senior Principal Researcher at Microsoft Research. Along with her research, Gray teaches at Indiana University, maintaining an appointment as an Associate Professor of the Media School, with affiliations in American Studies, Anthropology, and Gender Studies. In 2020, she was awarded a MacArthur Genius Grant in recognition of her work "investigating the ways in which labor, identity, and human rights are transformed by the digital economy."

Education 
In 1992, Gray completed a B.A. in anthropology and Native American studies at University of California, Davis. Her senior project explored the role of contemporary Alaskan Native single mothers in subsistence economies. Her advisors were David Risling and William G. Davis. In 1999, Gray earned a M.A. in anthropology from San Francisco State University. Her thesis was on queer youth narratives, the topic of her first book. Gray's advisors were John Paul De Cecco and Gilbert Herdt. She completed a Ph.D. in communication at University of California, San Diego in 2004. Gray's doctoral advisors were Susan Leigh Star and Olga Vásquez. Her dissertation was titled Coming of Age in a Digital Era: Youth Queering Technologies in Small Town, USA.

Career 
Gray's early works explore the experiences of LGBTQ youth, with a particular focus on the lives of those in rural areas. Her book Out in the Country: Youth, Media, and Queer Visibility in Rural America examined how queer young people use digital tools to connect with and create community, challenging the primacy of urban areas as the focus of LGBTQ experience. Gray's most recent book, Ghost Work: How to Stop Silicon Valley from Building a New Global Underclass, takes a deep dive into the depths of the "ghosts" or, human labor force, that allow some of the internet's largest websites to run smoothly. The book takes a look at big companies, like Google and Amazon, that use these "ghost workers" to do things like censor their sites while trying to pass it off as AI.

Awards

 Ruth Benedict Prize
 MacArthur Fellows Program 2020

Selected works 

 
 
 
  See also Ghost Work.

References

External links

Year of birth missing (living people)
Living people
American women anthropologists
Artificial intelligence ethicists
21st-century American anthropologists
21st-century American non-fiction writers
21st-century American women writers
Microsoft employees
Indiana University Bloomington faculty
American women non-fiction writers
Berkman Fellows
University of California, Davis alumni
University of California, San Diego alumni
San Francisco State University alumni
MacArthur Fellows